St Philip Parish is one of the 57 parishes of Cumberland County, New South Wales, a cadastral unit for use on land titles. It is located on the western part of the original colony at Sydney Cove, which was to the west of the Tank Stream. It is one of the four small parishes in the Sydney city area (together with St Andrew, St Lawrence and St James) and is named after the church of St Philip's. It includes the southern end of the Sydney Harbour Bridge, The Rocks, Dawes Point and Millers Point. It is bounded by Sydney Harbour in the north, King Street in the south, George Street in the south-east, and what was once the Tank Stream in the east (now near a small part of Hunter Street, Milton street and part of Pitt Street in the east, near but not including Circular Quay). The northern end of Darling Harbour is the boundary in the west. It includes Wynyard railway station.

Locations 
Images of locations in the Parish of St Philip:

References

 
 Map of the Parish of St. Philip, County of Cumberland, 1930, National Library of Australia

Parishes of Cumberland County